The 31st United States Congress was a meeting of the legislative branch of the United States federal government, consisting of the United States Senate and the United States House of Representatives. It met in Washington, D.C. from March 4, 1849, to March 4, 1851, during the 16 months of the Zachary Taylor presidency and the first eight months of the administration of Millard Fillmore's.  The apportionment of seats in this House of Representatives was based on the 1840 United States census. The Senate had a Democratic majority, while there was a Democratic plurality in the House.

Major events

 March 4, 1849: Zachary Taylor became President of the United States
 June, 1849: Relations with France broke down as the French ambassador Guillaume-Tell de La Vallée Poussin engaged in "insulting and confrontational" behavior towards President Taylor, shortly after this a row erupted with France over reparations which France owed the United States. The president of France, Napoleon III, made this worse by making remarks that led to several members of Congress openly condemning him.
 December 3–22, 1849: The election for the House speakership takes 63 ballots.
 March 7, 1850: Senator Daniel Webster gave his "Seventh of March" speech in which he endorsed the Compromise of 1850 to prevent a possible civil war
 May 22, 1850: Senate votes 42-11 in favor of ratifying the Clayton–Bulwer Treaty after the motion to do so was put forth by William R. King of Alabama. The results of the vote were celebrated in Britain.
 July 9, 1850: President Taylor died and Vice President Millard Fillmore became President.

Major legislation

September 9, 1850: Compromise of 1850, sess. 1, chs. 48-51,  - 
September 18, 1850: Fugitive Slave Act, sess. 1, ch. 60, 
September 20, 1850: "An Act to suppress the Slave Trade in the District of Columbia," sess. 1, ch. 63, 
September 29, 1850: Donation Land Claim Act, sess. 1, ch. 76,

States admitted and territories organized
September 9, 1850 — As part of the Compromise of 1850:
 Texas's borders were changed, ch. 49, 
 New Mexico Territory was organized, ch. 49, 
 California was admitted as a state, ch. 50, 
 Utah Territory was organized, ch. 51,

Party summary

Senate 
During this Congress, two Senate seats were added for the new state of California.

House of Representatives
During this Congress, two House seats were added for the new state of California.

Leadership

Senate
 President: Millard Fillmore (W), until July 9, 1850; vacant thereafter.
 President pro tempore: David Atchison (D), until May 5, 1850
 William R. King (D), from May 6, 1850

House of Representatives
Speaker: Howell Cobb (D), elected December 22, 1849, after 63 ballots
 Democratic Caucus Chairman: James Thompson

Members
This list is arranged by chamber, then by state. Senators are listed by class, and representatives by district.

Skip to House of Representatives, below

Senate

Senators were elected by the state legislatures every two years, with one-third beginning new six-year terms with each Congress. Preceding the names in the list below are Senate class numbers, which indicate the cycle of their election. In this Congress, Class 1 meant their term ended with this Congress, facing re-election in 1850; Class 2 meant their term began in the last Congress, facing re-election in 1852; and Class 3 meant their term began in this Congress, facing re-election in 1854.

Alabama 
 2. Benjamin Fitzpatrick (D), until November 30, 1849 
 Jeremiah Clemens (D), from November 30, 1849
 3. William R. King (D)

Arkansas 
 2. William K. Sebastian (D)
 3. Solon Borland (D)

California 
 1. John C. Frémont (D), from September 10, 1850 (newly admitted state)
 3. William M. Gwin (D), from September 10, 1850 (newly admitted state)

Connecticut 
 1. Roger S. Baldwin (W)
 3. Truman Smith (W)

Delaware 
 1. John Wales (W)
 2. Presley Spruance (W)

Florida 
 1. David Levy Yulee (D)
 3. Jackson Morton (W)

Georgia 
 2. John Macpherson Berrien (W)
 3. William C. Dawson (W)

Illinois 
 2. Stephen A. Douglas (D)
 3. James Shields (D), until March 6, 1849
 James Shields (D), from December 3, 1849

Indiana 
 1. Jesse D. Bright (D)
 3. James Whitcomb (D)

Iowa 
 2. George Wallace Jones (D)
 3. Augustus C. Dodge (D)

Kentucky 
 2. Joseph R. Underwood (W)
 3. Henry Clay (W)

Louisiana 
 2. Solomon W. Downs (D)
 3. Pierre Soulé (D)

Maine 
 1. Hannibal Hamlin (D)
 2. James W. Bradbury (D)

Maryland 
 1. Reverdy Johnson (W), until March 7, 1849
 David Stewart (W), from December 6, 1849, until January 12, 1850
 Thomas Pratt (W), from January 12, 1850
 3. James Pearce (W)

Massachusetts 
 1. Daniel Webster (W), until July 22, 1850
 Robert C. Winthrop (W), from July 30, 1850, until February 1, 1851
 Robert Rantoul Jr. (D), from February 1, 1851
 2. John Davis (W)

Michigan 
 1. Lewis Cass (D)
 2. Alpheus Felch (D)

Mississippi 
 1. Jefferson Davis (D)
 2. Henry S. Foote (D)

Missouri 
 1. Thomas H. Benton (D)
 3. David R. Atchison (D)

New Hampshire 
 2. John P. Hale (FS)
 3. Moses Norris Jr. (D)

New Jersey 
 1. William L. Dayton (W)
 2. Jacob W. Miller (W)

New York 
 1. Daniel S. Dickinson (D)
 3. William H. Seward (W)

North Carolina 
 2. Willie P. Mangum (W)
 3. George E. Badger (W)

Ohio 
 1. Thomas Corwin (W), until July 20, 1850
 Thomas Ewing (W), from July 20, 1850
 3. Salmon P. Chase (FS)

Pennsylvania 
 1. Daniel Sturgeon (D)
 3. James Cooper (W)

Rhode Island 
 1. Albert C. Greene (W)
 2. John H. Clarke (W)

South Carolina 
 2. John C. Calhoun (D), until March 31, 1850
 Franklin H. Elmore (D), from April 11, 1850, until May 29, 1850
 Robert W. Barnwell (D), from June 4, 1850, until December 18, 1850
 R. Barnwell Rhett (D), from December 18, 1850
 3. Andrew Butler (D)

Tennessee 
 1. Hopkins Lacy Turney (D)
 2. John Bell (W)

Texas 
 1. Thomas J. Rusk (D)
 2. Samuel Houston (D)

Vermont 
 1. Samuel S. Phelps (W)
 3. William Upham (W)

Virginia 
 1. James M. Mason (D)
 2. Robert M. T. Hunter (D)

Wisconsin 
 1. Henry Dodge (D)
 3. Isaac P. Walker (D)

House of Representatives
The names of members of the House of Representatives are preceded by their district numbers.

Alabama 
 . William J. Alston (W)
 . Henry W. Hilliard (W)
 . Sampson W. Harris (D)
 . Samuel W. Inge (D)
 . David Hubbard (D)
 . Williamson R. W. Cobb (D)
 . Franklin W. Bowdon (D)

Arkansas 
 . Robert W. Johnson (D)

California 
Both representatives were elected statewide on a general ticket.
 . Edward Gilbert (D), from September 11, 1850 (newly admitted state)
 . George W. Wright (I), from September 11, 1850 (newly admitted state)

Connecticut 
 . Loren P. Waldo (D)
 . Walter Booth (FS)
 . Chauncey F. Cleveland (D)
 . Thomas B. Butler (W)

Delaware 
 . John W. Houston (W)

Florida 
 . Edward C. Cabell (W)

Georgia 
 . Thomas Butler King (W), until March 3, 1850
 Joseph W. Jackson (D), from March 4, 1850
 . Marshall J. Wellborn (D)
 . Allen F. Owen (W)
 . Hugh A. Haralson (D)
 . Thomas C. Hackett (D)
 . Howell Cobb (D)
 . Alexander H. Stephens (W)
 . Robert A. Toombs (W)

Illinois 
 . William H. Bissell (D)
 . John A. McClernand (D)
 . Timothy R. Young (D)
 . John Wentworth (D)
 . William A. Richardson (D)
 . Edward D. Baker (W)
 . Thomas L. Harris (D)

Indiana 
 . Nathaniel Albertson (D)
 . Cyrus L. Dunham (D)
 . John L. Robinson (D)
 . George W. Julian (FS)
 . William J. Brown (D)
 . Willis A. Gorman (D)
 . Edward W. McGaughey (W)
 . Joseph E. McDonald (D)
 . Graham N. Fitch (D)
 . Andrew J. Harlan (D)

Iowa 
 . William Thompson (D), until June 29, 1850
 Daniel F. Miller (W), from December 20, 1850
 . Shepherd Leffler (D)

Kentucky 
 . Linn Boyd (D)
 . James L. Johnson (W)
 . Finis E. McLean (W)
 . George A. Caldwell (D)
 . John B. Thompson (W)
 . Daniel Breck (W)
 . Humphrey Marshall (W)
 . Charles S. Morehead (W)
 . John C. Mason (D)
 . Richard H. Stanton (D)

Louisiana 
 . Emile La Sére (D)
 . Charles M. Conrad (W), until August 17, 1850
 Henry A. Bullard (W), from December 5, 1850
 . John H. Harmanson (D), until October 24, 1850
 Alexander G. Penn (D), from December 30, 1850
 . Isaac E. Morse (D)

Maine 
 . Elbridge Gerry (D)
 . Nathaniel Littlefield (D)
 . John Otis (W)
 . Rufus K. Goodenow (W)
 . Cullen Sawtelle (D)
 . Charles Stetson (D)
 . Thomas J. D. Fuller (D)

Maryland 
 . Richard Bowie (W)
 . William T. Hamilton (D)
 . Edward Hammond (D)
 . Robert M. McLane (D)
 . Alexander Evans (W)
 . John B. Kerr (W)

Massachusetts 
 . Robert C. Winthrop (W), until July 30, 1850
 Samuel Atkins Eliot (W), from August 22, 1850
 . Daniel P. King (W), until July 25, 1850
 . James H. Duncan (W)
 . vacant
 . Charles Allen (FS)
 . George Ashmun (W)
 . Julius Rockwell (W)
 . Horace Mann (W)
 . Orin Fowler (W)
 . Joseph Grinnell (W)

Michigan 
 . Alexander W. Buel (D)
 . William Sprague (W)
 . Kinsley S. Bingham (D)

Mississippi 
 . Jacob Thompson (D)
 . Winfield S. Featherston (D)
 . William McWillie (D)
 . Albert G. Brown (D)

Missouri 
 . James B. Bowlin (D)
 . William V. Bay (D)
 . James S. Green (D)
 . Willard P. Hall (D)
 . John S. Phelps (D)

New Hampshire 
 . Amos Tuck (FS)
 . Charles H. Peaslee (D)
 . James Wilson (W), until September 9, 1850
 George W. Morrison (D), from October 8, 1850
 . Harry Hibbard (D)

New Jersey 
 . Andrew K. Hay (W)
 . William A. Newell (W)
 . Isaac Wildrick (D)
 . John Van Dyke (W)
 . James G. King (W)

New York 
 . John A. King (W)
 . David A. Bokee (W)
 . J. Phillips Phoenix (W)
 . Walter Underhill (W)
 . George Briggs (W)
 . James Brooks (W)
 . William Nelson (W)
 . Ransom Halloway (W)
 . Thomas McKissock (W)
 . Herman D. Gould (W)
 . Peter H. Silvester (W)
 . Gideon Reynolds (W)
 . John L. Schoolcraft (W)
 . George R. Andrews (W)
 . John R. Thurman (W)
 . Hugh White (W)
 . Henry P. Alexander (W)
 . Preston King (FS)
 . Charles E. Clarke (W)
 . Orsamus B. Matteson (W)
 . Hiram Walden (D)
 . Henry Bennett (W)
 . William Duer (W)
 . Daniel Gott (W)
 . Harmon S. Conger (W)
 . William T. Jackson (W)
 . William A. Sackett (W)
 . Abraham M. Schermerhorn (W)
 . Robert L. Rose (W)
 . David Rumsey Jr. (W)
 . Elijah Risley (W)
 . Elbridge G. Spaulding (W)
 . Harvey Putnam (W)
 . Lorenzo Burrows (W)

North Carolina 
 . Thomas L. Clingman (W)
 . Joseph P. Caldwell (W)
 . Edmund Deberry (W)
 . Augustine H. Shepperd (W)
 . Abraham W. Venable (D)
 . John R. J. Daniel (D)
 . William S. Ashe (D)
 . Edward Stanly (W)
 . David Outlaw (W)

Ohio 
 . David T. Disney (D)
 . Lewis D. Campbell (W)
 . Robert C. Schenck (W)
 . Moses B. Corwin (W)
 . Emery D. Potter (D)
 . Rodolphus Dickinson (D), until March 20, 1849
 Amos E. Wood (D), from December 3, 1849, until November 19, 1850
 John Bell (W), from January 7, 1851
 . Jonathan D. Morris (D)
 . John L. Taylor (W)
 . Edson B. Olds (D)
 . Charles Sweetser (D)
 . John K. Miller (D)
 . Samuel F. Vinton (W)
 . William A. Whittlesey (D)
 . Nathan Evans (W)
 . William F. Hunter (W)
 . Moses Hoagland (D)
 . Joseph Cable (D)
 . David K. Cartter (D)
 . John Crowell (W)
 . Joshua R. Giddings (FS)
 . Joseph M. Root (FS)

Pennsylvania 
 . Lewis C. Levin (A)
 . Joseph R. Chandler (W)
 . Henry D. Moore (W)
 . John Robbins Jr. (D)
 . John Freedley (W)
 . Thomas Ross (D)
 . Jesse C. Dickey (W)
 . Thaddeus Stevens (W)
 . William Strong (D)
 . Milo M. Dimmick (D)
 . Chester P. Butler (W), until October 5, 1850
 John Brisbin (D), from November 13, 1850
 . David Wilmot (D)
 . Joseph Casey (W)
 . Charles W. Pitman (W)
 . Henry Nes (W), until September 10, 1850
 Joel B. Danner (D), from December 2, 1850
 . James X. McLanahan (D)
 . Samuel Calvin (W)
 . Andrew J. Ogle (W)
 . Job Mann (D)
 . Robert R. Reed (W)
 . Moses Hampton (W)
 . John W. Howe (FS)
 . James Thompson (D)
 . Alfred Gilmore (D)

Rhode Island 
 . George G. King (W)
 . Nathan F. Dixon Jr. (W)

South Carolina 
 . Daniel Wallace (D)
 . James L. Orr (D)
 . Joseph A. Woodward (D)
 . John McQueen (D)
 . Armistead Burt (D)
 . Isaac E. Holmes (D)
 . William F. Colcock (D)

Tennessee 
 . Andrew Johnson (D)
 . Albert G. Watkins (W)
 . Josiah M. Anderson (W)
 . John H. Savage (D)
 . George W. Jones (D)
 . James H. Thomas (D)
 . Meredith P. Gentry (W)
 . Andrew Ewing (D)
 . Isham G. Harris (D)
 . Frederick P. Stanton (D)
 . Christopher H. Williams (W)

Texas 
 . David S. Kaufman (D), until January 31, 1851
 . Volney E. Howard (D)

Vermont 
 . William Henry (W)
 . William Hebard (W)
 . George P. Marsh (W), until May 29, 1849
 James Meacham (W), from December 3, 1849
 . Lucius B. Peck (D)

Virginia 
 . John S. Millson (D)
 . Richard K. Meade (D)
 . Thomas H. Averett (D)
 . Thomas S. Bocock (D)
 . Paulus Powell (D)
 . James A. Seddon (D)
 . Thomas H. Bayly (D)
 . Alexander Holladay (D)
 . Jeremiah Morton (W)
 . Richard Parker (D)
 . James McDowell (D)
 . Henry A. Edmundson (D)
 . LaFayette McMullen (D)
 . James M. H. Beale (D)
 . Alexander Newman (D), until September 8, 1849
 Thomas Haymond (W), from November 8, 1849

Wisconsin 
 . Charles Durkee (FS)
 . Orasmus Cole (W)
 . James D. Doty (D)

Non-voting members 
 . Henry H. Sibley, from July 7, 1849
 . Samuel Thurston (D)

Changes in membership
The count below reflects changes from the beginning of the first session of this Congress.

Senate
 Replacements: 5
 Democrats (D): no net change
 Whigs (W): no net change
 Deaths: 1
 Resignations: 3
 Seats from newly admitted states: 2
 Interim appointments: 4
Total seats with changes: 8

|-
| Illinois(3)
|  | James Shields (D)
| Senate voided election March 6, 1849, as Sen. Shields was determined not to have been a US citizen for the number of years required by the Constitution.Incumbent was re-elected October 27, 1849, having by then qualified.
|  | James Shields (D)
| Seated December 3, 1849

|-
| Maryland(1)
|  | Reverdy Johnson (W)
| Resigned March 7, 1849, having been appointed United States Attorney General
|  | David Stewart (W)
| Appointed December 6, 1849

|-
| Alabama(2)
|  | Benjamin Fitzpatrick (D)
| Sen. Dixon Lewis successor elected November 30, 1849
|  | Jeremiah Clemens (D)
| Elected November 30, 1849

|-
| Maryland(1)
|  | David Stewart (W)
| Successor elected January 12, 1850
|  | Thomas Pratt (W)
| Elected January 12, 1850

|-
| South Carolina(2)
|  | John C. Calhoun (D)
| Died March 31, 1850
|  | Franklin H. Elmore (D)
| Appointed April 11, 1850

|-
| South Carolina(2)
|  | Franklin H. Elmore (D)
| Died May 29, 1850
|  | Robert W. Barnwell (D)
| Appointed June 4, 1850

|-
| Ohio(1)
|  | Thomas Corwin (W)
| Resigned July 20, 1850, after being appointed United States Secretary of the Treasury
|  | Thomas Ewing (W)
| Appointed July 20, 1850

|-
| Massachusetts(1)
|  | Daniel Webster (W)
| Resigned July 22, 1850, after being appointed United States Secretary of State again.
|  | Robert C. Winthrop (W)
| Appointed July 30, 1850

|-
| California(1)
| New state
| California admitted to the Union September 9, 1850.The first Senator was elected September 10, 1850.
|  | John C. Frémont (D)
| Elected September 10, 1850

|-
| California(3)
| New state
| California admitted to the Union September 9, 1850.The first Senator was elected September 10, 1850.
|  | William M. Gwin (D)
| Elected September 10, 1850

|-
| South Carolina(2)
|  | Robert W. Barnwell (D)
| Successor elected December 18, 1850
|  | Robert Rhett (D)
| Elected December 18, 1850

|-
| Massachusetts(1)
|  | Robert C. Winthrop (W)
| Successor elected February 1, 1851
|  | Robert Rantoul Jr. (D)
| Elected February 1, 1851
|}

House of Representatives
 Replacements: 11
 Democrats (D): 2 seat net gain
 Whigs (W): 2 seat net loss
 Deaths: 8
 Resignations: 5
 Contested election:1
 Seats from newly admitted states: 2
Total seats with changes: 16

|-
| 
| Vacant
| style="font-size:80%" | Seat remained vacant after territory became organized at end of previous congress
| Henry H. Sibley
| Seated July 7, 1849
|-
| 
|  | George Perkins Marsh (W)
| style="font-size:80%" | Resigned some time in 1849
|  | James Meacham (W)
| Seated December 3, 1849
|-
| 
|  | Rodolphus Dickinson (D)
| style="font-size:80%" | Died March 20, 1849
|  | Amos E. Wood (D)
| Seated December 3, 1849
|-
| 
|  | Alexander Newman (D)
| style="font-size:80%" | Died September 8, 1849
|  | Thomas Haymond (W)
| Seated November 8, 1849
|-
| 
|  | Thomas B. King (W)
| style="font-size:80%" | Resigned March 3, 1850
|  | Joseph W. Jackson (D)
| Seated March 4, 1850
|-
| 
|  | Daniel P. King (W)
| style="font-size:80%" | Died July 25, 1850
| Vacant
| Not filled this term
|-
| 
|  | William Thompson (D)
| style="font-size:80%" | Seat declared vacant June 29, 1850, after contested election. House ruled neither candidate entitled to seat and forced special election
|  | Daniel F. Miller (W)
| Seated December 20, 1850
|-
| 
|  | Robert C. Winthrop (W)
| style="font-size:80%" | Resigned July 30, 1850, after being appointed to the US Senate
|  | Samuel A. Eliot (W)
| Seated August 22, 1850
|-
| 
|  | Charles M. Conrad (W)
| style="font-size:80%" | Resigned August 17, 1850, after being appointed United States Secretary of War
|  | Henry A. Bullard (W)
| Seated December 5, 1850
|-
| 
|  | James Wilson (W)
| style="font-size:80%" | Resigned September 9, 1850
|  | George W. Morrison (D)
| Seated October 8, 1850
|-
| 
| colspan=2 style="font-size:80%" | California admitted into the Union September 9, 1850, and seat remained vacant until September 11, 1850
|  | Edward Gilbert (D)
| Seated September 11, 1850
|-
| 
| colspan=2 style="font-size:80%" | California admitted into the Union September 9, 1850, and seat remained vacant until September 11, 1850
|  | George W. Wright (I)
| Seated September 11, 1850
|-
| 
|  | Henry Nes (W)
| style="font-size:80%" | Died September 10, 1850
|  | Joel B. Danner (D)
| Seated December 2, 1850
|-
| 
|  | Chester P. Butler (W)
| style="font-size:80%" | Died October 5, 1850
|  | John Brisbin (D)
| Seated November 13, 1850
|-
| 
|  | John H. Harmanson (D)
| style="font-size:80%" | Died October 24, 1850
|  | Alexander G. Penn (D)
| Seated December 30, 1850
|-
| 
|  | Amos E. Wood (D)
| style="font-size:80%" | Died November 19, 1850
|  | John Bell (W)
| Seated January 7, 1851
|-
| 
|  | David S. Kaufman (D)
| style="font-size:80%" | Died January 31, 1851
| Vacant
| Not filled this term
|}

Committees
Lists of committees and their party leaders.

Senate

 Agriculture (Chairman: Daniel Sturgeon)
 Audit and Control the Contingent Expenses of the Senate (Chairman: Augustus Dodge)
 California's Admission to the Union (Select)
 Claims (Chairman: Moses Norris Jr.)
 Commerce (Chairman: Clement C. Clay)
 Disorder in the Senate of April 17, 1850 (Select)
 Distributing Public Revenue Among the States (Select)
 District of Columbia (Chairman: James M. Mason)
 Eligibility of James Shields (Special)
 Finance (Chairman: Daniel S. Dickinson then James Pearce)
 Foreign Relations (Chairman: William R. King then Henry S. Foote) 
 French Spoilations (Select) (Chairman: Truman Smith)
 Indian Affairs (Chairman: David R. Atchison)
 Judiciary (Chairman: Andrew P. Butler) 
 Manufactures (Chairman: William K. Sebastian)
 Mexican Boundary Commission (Select)
 Military Affairs (Chairman: Jefferson Davis)
 Militia (Chairman: Sam Houston)
 Naval Affairs (Chairman: David Levy Yulee)
 Ordnance and War Ships (Select)
 Patents and the Patent Office (Chairman: David S. Reid)
 Pensions (Chairman: George Wallace Jones)
 Post Office and Post Roads (Chairman: Thomas J. Rusk)
 Printing (Chairman: Solon Borland)
 Private Land Claims (Chairman: Solomon W. Downs)
 Public Buildings and Grounds (Chairman: Robert M.T. Hunter) 
 Public Lands (Chairman: Alpheus Felch)
 Retrenchment (Chairman: James W. Bradbury) 
 Revolutionary Claims (Chairman: Isaac P. Walker)
 Roads and Canals (Chairman: Jesse D. Bright) 
 Seventh Census (Select)
 Settlement of the Slavery Question (Select)
 Tariff Regulation (Select)
 Territories (Chairman: Stephen A. Douglas)
 Whole

House of Representatives

 Accounts (Chairman: Daniel P. King)
 Agriculture (Chairman: Nathaniel S. Littlefield)
 Bounty Land Act of 1850 (Select)
 Claims (Chairman: John Reeves Jones Daniel)
 Commerce (Chairman: Robert M. McLane)
 District of Columbia (Chairman: Albert G. Brown)
 Elections (Chairman: William Strong) 
 Engraving (Chairman: Edward Hammond)
 Expenditures in the Navy Department (Chairman: Alexander Holladay)
 Expenditures in the Post Office Department (Chairman: William Thompson)
 Expenditures in the State Department (Chairman: Kingsley S. Bingham)
 Expenditures in the Treasury Department (Chairman: George A. Caldwell)
 Expenditures in the War Department (Chairman: Milo M. Dimmick)
 Expenditures on Public Buildings (Chairman: James M. H. Beale)
 Foreign Affairs (Chairman: John A. McClernand)
 Indian Affairs (Chairman: Robert W. Johnson)
 Invalid Pensions (Chairman: Shepherd Leffler)
 Judiciary (Chairman: James Thompson) 
 Manufactures (Chairman: Lucius B. Peck)
 Mileage (Chairman: Graham N. Fitch)
 Military Affairs (Chairman: Armistead Burt)
 Militia (Chairman: Charles H. Peaslee)
 Naval Affairs (Chairman: Frederick P. Stanton)
 Patents (Chairman: Hiram Walden)
 Post Office and Post Roads (Chairman: Emery D. Potter)
 Private Land Claims (Chairman: Isaac E. Morse)
 Public Buildings and Grounds (Chairman: Franklin W. Bowdon)
 Public Expenditures (Chairman: Andrew Johnson)
 Public Lands (Chairman: James B. Bowlin)
 Revisal and Unfinished Business (Chairman: Williamson R. W. Cobb)
 Revolutionary Claims (Chairman: Cullen Sawtelle)
 Revolutionary Pensions (Chairman: Loren P. Waldo)
 Roads and Canals (Chairman: John L. Robinson)
 Rules (Chairman: David S. Kaufman)
 Standards of Official Conduct
 Territories (Chairman: Linn Boyd)
 Ways and Means (Chairman: Thomas H. Bayly)
 Whole

Joint committees

 Enrolled Bills (Chairman: Sen. Thomas J. Rusk then Sen. George Badger)
 The Library (Chairman: N/A)
 The Printing (Chairman: N/A)

Caucuses 
 Democratic (House)
 Democratic (Senate)

Employees 
 Librarian of Congress: John Silva Meehan

Senate
Chaplain: Henry Slicer (Methodist), until January 9, 1850
 Clement M. Butler (Episcopalian), elected January 9, 1850
Secretary: Asbury Dickins
Sergeant at Arms: Robert Beale

House of Representatives
Chaplain: Ralph Gurley (Presbyterian)
Clerk: Thomas J. Campbell, died April 13, 1850
 Richard M. Young, elected April 17, 1850
Doorkeeper: Robert E. Horner
Postmaster: John M. Johnson
Reading Clerks: 
Sergeant at Arms: Nathan Sargent, until January 15, 1850
 Adam J. Glossbrenner, from January 15, 1850

See also 
 1848 United States elections (elections leading to this Congress)
 1848 United States presidential election
 1848–49 United States Senate elections
 1848–49 United States House of Representatives elections
 1850 United States elections (elections during this Congress, leading to the next Congress)
 1850–51 United States Senate elections
 1850–51 United States House of Representatives elections

Notes

References

External links
Statutes at Large, 1789-1875 
Senate Journal, First Forty-three Sessions of Congress
House Journal, First Forty-three Sessions of Congress
Biographical Directory of the U.S. Congress 
U.S. House of Representatives: House History 
U.S. Senate: Statistics and Lists